Wayne Allen Schurr  (born August 6, 1937) is an American former Major League Baseball relief pitcher who appeared in 26 games for the Chicago Cubs in .

Schurr attended Hillsdale College in Michigan. His eight-season professional baseball career began when he signed with the San Francisco Giants as an amateur free agent in 1959. Acquired by the Cubs in the 1963 Rule 5 draft, Schurr spent the first three months of the 1964 campaign in the major leagues. He did not earn a decision or a save, and posted a 3.72 earned run average. In 48 innings pitched, he permitted 57  hits and 11 bases on balls, with 29 strikeouts. On May 29 at Wrigley Field, Schurr threw 5 scoreless innings in relief against the Milwaukee Braves before exiting the game for a pinch hitter; his effort enabled the Cubs to stay close in a ballgame they would eventually lose 6–5.

He retired from baseball after the 1966 minor-league season.

References

External links

1937 births
Living people
Baseball players from Indiana
Chicago Cubs players
El Paso Sun Kings players
Eugene Emeralds players
Hillsdale Chargers baseball players
Major League Baseball pitchers
Michigan City White Caps players
People from DeKalb County, Indiana
Salt Lake City Bees players
Tacoma Cubs players
Tacoma Giants players
Victoria Giants players